Tetrakis(dimethylamino)ethylene (TDAE) is an organic compound with the formula [C(NMe2)2]2 (where Me = CH3). A colorless liquid, this compound is classified as an enamine.  Primary and secondary enamines tend to isomerize, but tertiary enamines are kinetically stable.  The unusual feature of TDAE is that it is a tetra-enamine.  The pi-donating tendency of the amine groups strongly modifies the properties of the molecule, which does exhibit properties of a typical alkene.

Reactions
TDAE reacts with oxygen in a chemiluminescent reaction to give tetramethylurea

TDAE is an electron donor with E = 1.06 V vs Fc+/0. It forms a charge transfer salt with buckminsterfullerene:
C2(N(CH3)2)4  +  C60   →   [C2(N(CH3)2)4+][C60−]
Oxidation affords a dication.

Structure
Crystallographic analysis show that TDAE is a highly distorted alkene, the dihedral angle for the two N2C termini is 28″.  The C=C distance is alkene-like, 135 pm.  The nearly isostructural tetraisopropylethylene also has a C=C distance of 135 pm, but its C6 core is planar.  In contrast, [TDAE]2+ is an alkane with multi-C-N bonds.

References

Dimethylamino compounds
Enamines
Chemiluminescence